Anita Haynes is a Trinidad and Tobago politician representing the United National Congress. She has served as a Member of Parliament in the House of Representatives for Tabaquite since the 2020 general election. She was previously an Opposition Senator from 2017 to 2020. She is the first female MP for Tabaquite.

Early life 
Haynes grew up in Piparo, Trinidad. Her father is a police officer and her mother is a real estate agent, and she is the eldest of three daughters. She graduated from St Joseph's Convent, San Fernando in 2006, where she was the president of the debating team. She attended St John's University in New York on a full scholarship where she initially studied finance before switching her major to government and politics. She moved back to Trinidad and Tobago in 2011 when Kamla Persad-Bissessar was elected as the first female Prime Minister. She also received a Law degree from the University of London.

Political career 
Haynes began her political career by getting a job at the Office of the Prime Minister, working in multilateral relations. She joined the United National Congress and became their Public Relations Officer in July 2017. She was appointed as an Opposition Senator for the United National Congress on 29 September 2017, where she served as the lead for Foreign Affairs, Energy Affairs, Communications, Education, and Youth Affairs.

She was elected to the Trinidad and Tobago House of Representatives on 10 August 2020 after the 2020 general election. She is a member for the electoral district of Tabaquite, a traditionally safe seat for the United National Congress. She is also the Shadow Minister of Education.

References 

Living people
Year of birth missing (living people)
United National Congress politicians
Members of the House of Representatives (Trinidad and Tobago)
21st-century Trinidad and Tobago women politicians
21st-century Trinidad and Tobago politicians
St. John's University (New York City) alumni
Alumni of the University of London